LVJ may refer to:

Liverpool James Street railway station, Liverpool, National Rail station code
Pearland Regional Airport, Brazoria County, Texas, FAA LID airport code